Cryptantha osterhoutii, or Osterhout's cryptantha, is a rare herbaceous perennial occurring in the U.S. states of Colorado, Utah, and Arizona.  It is also known by the synonym Oreocarya osterhoutii Payson, and common name Osterhout cat's-eye.  It is named in honor of George Everett Osterhout.

References

osterhoustii
Plants described in 1927